{{DISPLAYTITLE:Tau2 Capricorni}}

Tau2 Capricorni, Latinized from τ2 Capricorni, is a triple star system in the constellation Capricornus. It is approximately 1,100 light years from Earth based on parallax. The system has a blue-white hue and a combined apparent visual magnitude of +5.20. Because it is positioned near the ecliptic, τ2 Capricorni can be occulted by the Moon. 

The primary, component A, is a B-type giant with a stellar classification of B6III and an apparent magnitude of +5.8. It has five times the mass of the Sun and is spinning rapidly with a projected rotational velocity of 170 km/s. The star is radiating 1,893 times the luminosity of the Sun from its photosphere at an effective temperature of 15,439 K.

At an angular separation of only 0.34 arcseconds is the companion, component B, a B-type subgiant star with a class of B6IV and an apparent magnitude of +6.3. These two stars orbit around their common centre of mass once every 420 years. A possible third component with an apparent magnitude of +9.5, detected by studying the star during occultation, is located 0.052 arcseconds away from the A component.

References

B-type giants
B-type subgiants
Triple star systems

Capricornus (constellation)
Capricorni, Tau2
Durchmusterung objects
Capricorni, 14
196662
101923
7889